William Barton Northrup,  (October 19, 1856 – October 22, 1925) was a Canadian lawyer and politician.

Born in Belleville, Canada West, the son of Anson Gilbert Northrup and Jane C. Balster, Northrup was educated at the Upper Canada College and the University of Toronto, where he received a Bachelor of Arts degree in 1877 and a Master of Arts degree in 1878. A lawyer he was head of the firm of Northrup & Roberts, in Belleville. He was created a King's Counsel in 1903.

He first ran unsuccessfully as the Conservative candidate for the House of Commons of Canada for the Ontario electoral district of Hastings East in the 1891 federal election losing to Liberal Samuel Barton Burdett. After Burdett died in office in 1892, Northrup was acclaimed in the resulting 1892 by-election. He was defeated in the 1896 federal election and was elected in 1900, 1904, 1908, and 1911.

From 1918 to 1924, he was the Clerk of the House of Commons.

References

1856 births
1925 deaths
Conservative Party of Canada (1867–1942) MPs
Members of the House of Commons of Canada from Ontario
Lawyers in Ontario
Politicians from Belleville, Ontario
University of Toronto alumni
Upper Canada College alumni
Clerks of the House of Commons (Canada)
Canadian King's Counsel